Marche-les-Dames is a village of Wallonia and a district of the city of Namur, located in the province of Namur, Belgium.

It is located on the bank of the Meuse river. Because of the high cliffs this place is popular with rock climbers.

History 
King Albert I died here in a 1934 mountaineering accident. The King fell from a rock face and his dead body was found later. At this site a memorial was erected to honour the king.

Movies shot at Marche-les-Dames 

 2009 : Sister Smile (film) de Stijn Coninx
 2012 : La Marque Des Anges de Sylvain White
 2015: Public Enemy (TV series) de Matthieu Frances et Gary Seghers

References

Former municipalities of Namur (province)